Ted Collinson (26 May 1907 – 17 June 1982) was  a former Australian rules footballer who played with Richmond in the Victorian Football League (VFL).

Notes

External links 
		

1907 births
1982 deaths
Australian rules footballers from Victoria (Australia)
Richmond Football Club players